West Lawn Heights Historic District is located in Madison, Wisconsin. It was added to the National Register of Historic Places in 1998.

History
Contributing buildings in the district were constructed from 1906 to 1946. Most of those were built in 1913 and after.

Gallery

References

Geography of Madison, Wisconsin
Historic districts on the National Register of Historic Places in Wisconsin
National Register of Historic Places in Madison, Wisconsin